CyberFight is a professional wrestling promotion based in Shinjuku, Tokyo. The company promotes several championships and title reigns are either determined by professional wrestling matches or are awarded to a wrestler, as a result of the culmination of various scripted storylines.

CyberFight was founded as an umbrella promotion for four promotions which are regarded as brands, in a similar manner to the WWE brand extension. The four promotions are DDT Pro-Wrestling (DDT), Pro Wrestling Noah (Noah), Tokyo Joshi Pro Wrestling (TJPW) and Ganbare☆Pro-Wrestling (GanPro).

DDT features six active singles championships, one active tag team championship, one active six-man tag team championship and one active ten-man tag team championship. Four of those titles carry the letters "KO-D", standing for "King of DDT", and are regarded as the promotion's primary titles. Noah features three active singles championships and two active tag team championships, all of which carry the letters "GHC", after Noah's governing body, Global Honored Crown. TJPW is a women's professional wrestling promotion that features two active singles championships and one active tag team championship. GanPro currently features one singles championship and one upcoming tag team title. DDT and GanPro's titles are open to anyone, regardless of gender.

There are currently 19 championships in CyberFight. , among the four current brands, 23 wrestlers officially hold championships. This list includes the number of times the wrestler has held the title, the date and location of the win, and a description of the winning bout.

Current champions

DDT

Noah

TJPW

GanPro

See also
 Champions in CyberFight lists
 List of Ironman Heavymetalweight Champions

 Personnel of CyberFight lists
 List of DDT Pro-Wrestling personnel
 List of Pro Wrestling Noah personnel

References

External links
 CyberFight official website
 DDT official website
 Noah official website
 TJPW official website
 GanPro official website

Professional wrestling champion lists